"Bad Girls Club" is a pop-rock song performed by German singer Jeanette. The song was written by Jeanette and Jörg Weisselberg and produced by Weisselberg and Steffen Langenfeld for Jeanette's sixth album Naked Truth (2006). It was released as a single on 14 October 2005 in Germany.

Formats and track listings
These are the formats and track listings of major single releases of "Bad Girls Club".

CD single
(602498745700; Released )
"Bad Girls Club" (Power version) – 3:26
"Bad Girls Club" (Power radio version) – 3:21
"Bad Girls Club" (Wild version) – 3:26
"Bad Girls Club" (Instrumental mix) – 3:24
"Nightmare" (L.A. version) – 3:38
"Bad Girls Club" music video

Digital download
(Released )
"Bad Girls Club" (Power version) – 3:26
"Bad Girls Club" (Power radio version) – 3:21
"Bad Girls Club" (Wild version) – 3:26
"Bad Girls Club" (Instrumental mix) – 3:24
"Nightmare" (L.A. version) – 3:38
"Bad Girls Club" (Acoustic version) – 3:33

Charts

Personnel
The following people contributed to "Bad Girls Club":

Jeanette - vocals
Jörg Weisselberg - production, guitars, bass guitar, programming
Steffen Langenfeld - production, keyboards, programming

References

2005 singles
Jeanette Biedermann songs
Songs written by Jeanette Biedermann
Songs written by Jörg Weisselberg
2005 songs
Universal Music Group singles